, provisional designation , is a resonant trans-Neptunian object of the plutino group, located in the Kuiper belt in the outermost region of the Solar System. It was discovered on 22 October 1998, by American astronomer Marc Buie at the Kitt Peak National Observatory in the United States. It is probably not a dwarf planet candidate.

Classification and orbit 

 belongs to the plutino population, which are named after the group's largest member, Pluto. Plutinos are resonant trans-Neptunian objects in 2:3 resonance with Neptune, orbiting the Sun twice for every three orbits Neptune does.

It orbits the Sun at a distance of 33.9–44.2 AU once every 244 years and 2 months (89,179 days; semi-major axis of 39.06 AU). Its orbit has an eccentricity of 0.13 and an inclination of 11° with respect to the ecliptic. The body's observation arc begins with its official discovery observation. Its orbit still has a fair amount of uncertainty.

Numbering and naming 

This minor planet was numbered by the Minor Planet Center on 28 October 2004. As of 2018, it has not been named.

Physical characteristics 

Based on an absolute magnitude of 8.0 and an assumed albedo of 0.09, the Johnston's Archive estimates a diameter of 111 kilometers. The body's spectrum (BB–BR) suggests a somewhat bluish color. As of 2018, no rotational lightcurve of  has been obtained from photometric observations.  it an unlikely dwarf planet candidate due to its small size, estimated by Michael Brown to measure 154 kilometers with a low albedo of 0.04.

References

External links 
 List Of Transneptunian Objects, Minor Planet Center
 List of Known Trans-Neptunian Objects, Johnston's Archive
 Discovery Circumstances: Numbered Minor Planets (90001)-(95000) – Minor Planet Center
 
 

091205
Discoveries by Marc Buie
19981022